Witchekan Lake 117 is an Indian reserve of the Witchekan Lake First Nation in Saskatchewan. It is 90 kilometres northeast of North Battleford. In the 2016 Canadian Census, it recorded a population of 10 living in 3 of its 3 total private dwellings.

References

Indian reserves in Saskatchewan
Division No. 16, Saskatchewan